John Smith was a shortstop in the National Association from  to . He played for three teams in three seasons.

Sources

Major League Baseball shortstops
Baltimore Marylands players
Baltimore Canaries players
New Haven Elm Citys players
Baseball players from Baltimore
Year of birth unknown
Year of death unknown
19th-century baseball players